Mud Bay is the southernmost reach of Puget Sound, at Eld Inlet just outside the city limits of Olympia, Washington. The name Eld Inlet was officially bestowed after a member of the U.S. Navy's Wilkes Expedition, but "Mud Bay" is a local, informal adoption.

It was once a highly productive ground for the Olympia Oyster. The first Indian Shaker Church building was constructed above the bay c. 1890, Mud Bay being the home of the founder Sam "Mud Bay Sam" Yowaluch, the first Bishop of the church.

The Mud Bay Logging Company ran a railroad to the bay where they had a log dump.

Landmarks and attractions
A roadside attraction was placed at the bay near U.S. Route 101 in 2002: a set of larger-than-life metal sculptures of cows and a bull created by Western Washington sculptor Gary Vig.

An interpretive sign about the landing of Peter Puget at Mud Bay was placed by the county's historical commission along Mud Bay Road.

The Blue Heron Bakery was a local landmark whole-grain bakery on the edge of the bay from 1978 until 2015 when it moved about a mile east into Olympia.

The Mud Bay Indian Shaker Church, the first church building of that religion, was built on the shoulder of the Black Hills overlooking the bay in 1885.

Events
The  is a traditional annual, 500-meter clothing-optional race across the mud flats at low tide. It is held on the day of, and just before, The Evergreen State College's graduation procession.

Notable people
People from the Mud Bay area include:
Mud Bay Sam Yowaluch, cofounder and Bishop of the Indian Shaker Church
Mud Bay Louie Yowaluch, Sam's brother and cofounder of the Indian Shaker Church
Angeline Tobin Frank, of the Squaxin Island Tribe, mother of Nisqually Tribe chairman Billy Frank, Jr., grew up within an oyster farming family on Mud Bay.
William McLane and Martha McLeod McLane, homesteaders on Mud Bay c. 1852. William McLane served several terms in the Washington Territorial Legislature.

References

Sources

Books

Further reading
 — including oral histories, maps, genealogical chart, and records of burials at three Indian cemeteries including McLane Cemetery and Tobin Cemetery in vicinity of Mud Bay. Includes bibliography.

External links

 

Bodies of water of Thurston County, Washington